Lê Thanh Tùng (born 24 October 1995) is a Vietnamese artistic gymnast. He competed at the 2019 World Artistic Gymnastics Championships held in Stuttgart, Germany. He represented Vietnam at the 2020 Summer Olympics in Tokyo, Japan.

In 2018, he competed at the Asian Games held in Jakarta, Indonesia. Four years earlier, he competed at the 2014 Asian Games held in Incheon, South Korea.

References

External links 
 

Living people
1995 births
Sportspeople from Ho Chi Minh City
Vietnamese male artistic gymnasts
Gymnasts at the 2014 Asian Games
Gymnasts at the 2018 Asian Games
Asian Games competitors for Vietnam
Competitors at the 2015 Southeast Asian Games
Competitors at the 2017 Southeast Asian Games
Competitors at the 2019 Southeast Asian Games
Competitors at the 2021 Southeast Asian Games
Southeast Asian Games gold medalists for Vietnam
Southeast Asian Games bronze medalists for Vietnam
Southeast Asian Games medalists in gymnastics
Gymnasts at the 2020 Summer Olympics
Olympic gymnasts of Vietnam
20th-century Vietnamese people
21st-century Vietnamese people